Nicholas Wunsch (born 5 October 2000) is an Austrian professional footballer who plays as a midfielder for First Vienna.

Professional career
Wunsch made his professional debut with Rapid Wien in a 2-1 Austrian Football Bundesliga loss to SC Rheindorf Altach on 25 May 2019.

References

External links
 
 OEFB Profile

2000 births
Living people
Austrian footballers
Austria youth international footballers
Association football midfielders
SK Rapid Wien players
First Vienna FC players
Austrian Football Bundesliga players
2. Liga (Austria) players
Austrian Regionalliga players